WVFT (93.3 FM) is a radio station broadcasting a talk radio format. Licensed to Gretna, Florida, United States, the station serves the Tallahassee area. The station is currently owned by Magic Broadcasting.  Studios are located near the interchange of Monroe Street and I-10 in Tallahassee, and its transmitter is in Midway, Florida.

On April 16, 2012, the then-WGWD changed its format to talk, and is now branded as "Real Talk 93.3". On December 10, 2012, the station changed its call sign to the current WVFT.

References

External links

VFT
Radio stations established in 1989
1989 establishments in Florida